This article contains the episode listing for all the animation produced for Kamichama Karin. Note that none of the English translations are official titles. In 2007, the televised anime series under the title  was produced by the Japanese animation studio Satelight. It first aired on 6 April 2007 on the Japanese television network TV Tokyo and was directed by Japanese animation director Takashi Anno.

Kamichama Karin